The Bud Metheny Baseball Complex is a stadium on the campus of Old Dominion University in Norfolk, Virginia, USA.  It is primarily used for baseball, and is the home field of the Old Dominion Monarchs baseball team. The Monarchs are members of Conference USA. The ballpark has seating for 2,500 spectators in three sections of raised aluminum bleachers. The stadium complex also includes locker rooms, a concession stand, offices, four batting cages, a picnic area and a fully enclosed press box. The facility replaced the university's football stadium, Foreman Field, as the home of the baseball team.

The ballpark is named after former Old Dominion head basketball coach, baseball manager, and athletic director Bud Metheny, who worked for the university from 1948 to 1980 after an eleven-year stint in the New York Yankees organization including a World Series championship in 1943. He compiled a record of 423 wins, 363 losses and 6 ties as manager of the Monarchs. Metheny's jersey number, 3, has been retired by the university and is displayed on the right field wall of the stadium.

The stadium opened for the 1983 baseball season, with the first game being a 7–2 Old Dominion win over Millersville University. The complex was not dedicated until April 25, 1984 with a game against the Virginia Tech Hokies. That night's crowd of 2,125 is the highest attendance in stadium history. The ballpark hosted the Sun Belt Conference baseball tournament in 1983, 1985, and 1987, and the Colonial Athletic Association baseball tournament in 1994. Old Dominion defended home field and won the 1985 Sun Belt and 1994 Colonial championships. The stadium has also hosted multiple Virginia district and state high school baseball tournaments. The Monarchs tied the NCAA record for double plays completed in a single game on May 14, 1985, with 7 during a home game against the Western Kentucky Hilltoppers. There have been eight no-hitters pitched at the stadium, all completed by Monarch pitchers. As of the completion of the 2021 season, Old Dominion has a record of 850 wins and 370 losses at the Bud, for a winning percentage of .697.

The stadium received a new video-LED scoreboard for the 2009 season as part of a partnership between Old Dominion and CBS Collegiate Sports Properties. The facility underwent an additional three million-dollar renovation for the 2011 season that erected a batters' backdrop in center field, locker room refurbishments and a beer garden. Renovations continued before the 2012 season included brick walls added down the foul lines, a clock above the scoreboard, and a custom outfield wall with images of former Monarchs who have played in the major leagues.

See also
 List of NCAA Division I baseball venues
Bud Metheny Baseball Complex, Special Collections and University Archives Wiki, Old Dominion University Libraries

References

Baseball venues in Virginia
College baseball venues in the United States
Old Dominion Monarchs baseball
Sports venues in Hampton Roads
Sports venues in Norfolk, Virginia
1983 establishments in Virginia
Sports venues completed in 1983